The Highways in Albania are the central state and main transport network in Albania. The motorways and expressways are both part of the national road network. They have white on green road signs such as in Italy and other countries nearby. The expressways are the secondary roads, also dual carriageways, but without an emergency lane. They have white on blue road signs.

The A1 is the country's longest and only toll highway connecting the port city of Durrës on the Adriatic Sea in the west as well as the capital of Tirana in the center, with the Republic of Kosovo in the northeast. The A3 is the second longest motorway and connects Tirana with the Pan-European Corridor VIII, running from Durrës on the Adriatic Sea to Varna on the Black Sea. The A2 is the third longest motorway and represent a significant north-south corridor within the country and the Adriatic-Ionian motorway.

The country is a member of the Pan-European Corridor system. The Pan-European Corridor VIII pass through the country and starts at Durrës on the Adriatic Sea in the west continuing across the Republic of North Macedonia and Bulgaria and ends at Varna at the Black Sea in the east.

The country signed the European Agreement on Main International Traffic Arteries in 2006. The following European routes are currently defined to end at, or near, the border of Albania such as the E86, E762, E851, E852, E853.

History 

Since antiquity, the area of Albania served as an important crossroad within the Roman Empire through the Via Pubblica and Via Egnatia. The former passed through northern Albania, while the latter linked Rome with Byzantium, through Durres on the Adriatic Sea. During World War I, occupying forces opened up new road sections mainly in the mountainous areas of the country. In King Zog's period, further road construction took place near Vlora and at Krraba Pass between Tirana and Elbasan.

The total length of Albania's roads more than doubled in the first three decades after World War II, and by the 1980s almost all of the country's remote mountain areas were connected, either by dirt or paved roads, with the capital city of Tirana, and ports on the Adriatic and Ionian Sea. Private car ownership was not allowed and the only vehicles circulating were state-owned trucks, agricultural and official's vehicles, buses, motorcycles, and bicycles. The country's roads, however, were generally narrow, poorly marked, pocked with holes, and in the early 1990s often crowded with pedestrians and people riding mules, bicycles, and horse-drawn carts.

The largest road project in the history of Albania was the construction of the A1 dual carriageway from 2007 to 2010, linking Albania with Kosovo. The segment involved the carving of a mountainous terrain, and the construction of a 5.6 km long tunnel and dozens of bridges. In 2010, Prime Minister Sali Berisha announced plans to build several major highways.

At present, major cities are linked with either single or dual carriageways or well maintained roads. There is a dual carriageway connecting the port city of Durrës with Tirana, Vlorë, and partially Kukës. In fact, there are three formal motorway segments in Albania: Thumanë-Milot-Rrëshen-Kalimash (A1), Levan-Vlorë (A2), and partly Tirane-Elbasan (A3). Most rural segments continue to remain in bad conditions as their reconstruction has only began in the late 2000s by the Albanian Development Fund.

Roads

Classification 

All roads in the country are property of Albanian Road Authority, a directorate subordinated to the Ministry of Transportation and Infrastructure based in Tirana. Currently, cars are free of payment while driving on both motorways and expressways except on A1 motorway which has become a toll highway since March 2018. A2 and A3 are planned to become toll highways in the near future. A new road system has been introduced in the early 2000s and is classified as follows:

Motorways 

The motorways in Albania are defined by the Ministry of Transportation and Infrastructure. The country's motorway network has been extensively modernised throughout the end of the communist regime and part of it is still under construction. In the Albanian language, they are called  and they are defined as roads with at least two lanes in each direction. The markings have green backgrounds and are identified as consisting of letter A and the motorway number assigned by the legislation.

Expressways 

The expressways in Albania are defined by the Ministry of Transportation and Infrastructure.

Construction work 

Following the end of communism in 1991, the highways in the country began to be modernized with the construction of the National Road 2, connecting the country's capital of Tiranë with the country's second largest city of Durrës. Since 2000, main roadways have drastically improved, though lacking standards in design and road safety. This involved the construction of new roadways, planting of trees and related greening projects, and lately the installing of contemporary signs. However, some state roads continue to deteriorate from lack of maintenance while others remain unfinished.

The priority of the first Rama government in 2014 was the completion of unfinished roadways, due to lack of funding. Another major priority was the completion of the Arbër Highway, connecting Tirana with the city of Debar in the Republic of North Macedonia through the current National Road 6. Eventually, this  will become part of the Pan-European Corridor VIII, linking Albania with the Republic of North Macedonia and Greece. Another important objectives include, the completion of the problematic Tirana-Elbasan Highway part of the A3, the launching of toll highways starting with A1, and the construction of the Southern Axis of Albania , passing across central and southern Albania. The completion of the Eastern Ring of Albania  passing through Valbonë, Kukës, Krumë, Bulqizë and Librazhd has also been a priority. When all corridors are completed, Albania will have an estimated 759 kilometers of highway linking it with its neighbors.

Winter maintenance
Winter 2021-22 marked the first time that main roadways in the Albanian Alps have been open for traffic after a snowfall. Therefore, the many guesthouses of the area now are accessible in the winter as well. This came as a result of using advanced snow clearing equipment by local authorities and contractors.
In recent years, winter maintenance has greatly improved in all major roadways of the country including the A1 toll motorway.

Controversies
 
Despite considerable investments, some dual carriageways are partially up to either motorway or state road standards as they are badly configured, contain unfinished overpasses, uncontrolled access points, lack of fencing and either misplaced or missing road signs, inadequate entry and exit ramps, and are indiscriminately used by animals, mopeds, agricultural vehicles, and pedestrians. These are mostly due to alleged corruption and lack of or low quality projects and feasibility studies. It is believed that the above structural problems can be eliminated by transforming some highways to toll highway, like the A1 toll motorway in Northern Albania which has brought it to acceptable motorway standards. Works on most highways are mostly completed, though they remained unfinished between 2011 and 2013 as per lack of funds.

In March 2018, violent clashes took place at the A1 motorway toll plaza in Kalimash, Northern Albania as locals demanded lower fees on a project that was unfinished, and lacked the availability of a secondary road.

Below is a list of main roadways undergoing construction works in the last decade. The Rama 2 Government plans to standardize road projects and continue those left unfinished from previous years:

As of Summer 2022

Planned
 Muriqan–Milot–Balldren–Lezhe–Thumane: Autostradë, part of the Blue Corridor or Adriatic-Ionian motorway
  Rrogozhine–Fier: Autostradë part of the Blue Corridor or Adriatic-Ionian motorway
 SH34 Perlat–Kurbnesh–Fushe Lure near Lure National Park
 Velipojë - Ulcinj (MNE)

Underway
  Qukës–Qafë Plloçë: Superstradë
  Korçë–Ersekë
 Tirana Northern Outer Ring
 SH61, SH6 Tiranë–Brar Canyon–Bulqizë, part of Arbër Highway: Superstradë
 Shëngjin - Velipojë
  Llogara Tunnel
  Thumanë–Kashar–Rrogozhinë: Autostradë part of the Blue Corridor or Adriatic-Ionian motorway

Completed
  Tiranë–Elbasan: Autostradë
   Fier Bypass: Autostradë
   Milot–Rrëshen–Kalimash–Kukës–Morinë: Autostradë, part of European Core Road Network's Route 7
  Tepelenë Bypass
  Lin–Pogradec: Superstradë
  Korçë–Qafë Plloçë: Superstradë (29 km)
   Milot Trumpet Interchange, part of Albania-Kosovo Highway
 Tirana Southwestern and Southeastern Outer Ring: Autostradë
  Rrogozhinë Bypass
  Durrës Bypass (Shkozet)
  Levan (Fier)–Vlorë: Autostradë, part of European Corridor 8. (24.20 km)
  Shkodër–Han i Hotit MNE, part of the European Core Road Network's Route 2
  Lezhë–Milot: Resurfacing, part of the European Core Road Network's Route 2
  Levan (Fier)–Tepelenë: Superstradë (70 km), part of the European Core Road Network's Route 2
  Durrës–Rrogozhinë: Autostradë (35 km),  part of European Corridor 8.
  Tepelenë–Gjirokastër: Superstradë, part of the European Core Road Network's Route 2
  Lushnjë–Fier: Autostradë, part of European Corridor 8 (21.70 km)
  Himarë–Sarandë: Superstradë
 SH20 Han i Hotit–Tamarë–Vermosh–Dogana MNE
 SH21 Koplik–Dedaj–Bogë: Rrugë
 SH22 Fierzë–Bajram Curri
 SH22 Bajram Curri–Tropojë: Superstradë
 K22 Valbonë–Dragobi–Bajram Curri
 SH38 Fushë Krujë–Krujë: Superstradë
 SH42 Dedaj–Razëm: Rrugë
 SH71 just south of Elbasan – E86 at Libonik
 SH72 Lushnjë–Berat
 SH81 Sarandë–Butrint: Superstradë
 Sarandë–Qafë Botë GR: Superstradë
 Bajram Curri–Margegaj: Superstradë
 SH21 Bogë–Theth
 SH27 Shkodër–Velipojë
 Tirana Eastern Ring
  Shkodër Bypass
 Kardhiq - Delvinë
 SH76, SH77 Vlorë River Highway (Vlorë–Kuç–Qeparo) 
 Vlorë Bypass
 Palasë - Dhermi (Part 1)
  Crossing of TEG
 Most coastal roads
 Other rural segments

Driving in Albania
 
Despite the perceived negative connotation to driving in Albania, most vehicles manage not to get into accidents by simply exercising common sense and following their own way through the traffic. In cities, traffic is slow thus more secure than in rural areas.  Albanian drivers are prone to using visual and acoustic aids regularly such as honking, headlight flashing, or high beams at night. Daytime running lamps must be activated outside urban areas.

It is strongly recommended to have an up-to-date GPS, as many new roads have been recently added to the Albanian road network. If the GPS does not work, a paper or internet-based map would be useful. Street names on the ground do not always coincide with maps as the current address system has been recently introduced. In the mountains, some roads can be narrow and windy with hairpins, unpaved, and missing guardrails. A portion of these roads are being gradually paved and brought to European standards by the Albanian Development Fund, FSHZH. Other roads still have few road signs or misleading ones. It's strongly advised to always keep a spare tire.

See also 
 Economy of Albania
 Transport in Albania
 Tourism in Albania

References

External links 

 Ministria e Infrastrukturës Official Website (Ministry of Infrastructure of Albania)
 Autoriteti Rrugor Shqiptar Official Website (Albanian Roads Authority)